Three vessels of the French Navy have borne the name Colosse ("Colossus"):

 , a 36-gun frigate, bore the name Colosse in her late career.
 , an  118-gun ship of the line, bore the name Colosse when she was used as a barack hulk.

Notes and references 

French Navy ship names